Koforidua Technical University is one of the ten Technical Universities  established in every region in Ghana. It was founded in 1997. Since 1999 it has produced graduates with HND in accountancy, (secretaryship and management studies), marketing, purchasing and supply, statistics and computer science.

Introduction 
The institution has five faculties and one institute: Faculty of Business and Management Studies, Faculty of Applied Sciences and Technology, Faculty of Engineering, Faculty of Built and Natural Environment, Faculty of Health and Allied Sciences and the Institute of Open and Distance Learning. Since its establishment the university, its number of HND programs have increased from 2 to 14. 6 of the programs are offered by the School of Business and Management Studies, 6 from the Faculty of Engineering and 4 from the School of Applied Science and Technology.

To fulfill its 2010-2014 strategic plans, it now offers Bachelor of Technology programs for only 2 courses-procurement and Automotive Engineering. Other courses are looking to be added. Koforidua Technical University has the support of a number of institutions which includes Ministry of Education and its agencies, National Council for Tertiary Education, National Accreditation Board, National Board for Professional and Technician Examinations, [./Http://www.getfund.gov.gh/ Ghana Education Trust Fund] and the Council for Technical and Vocational Education and Training.

Koforidua Technical university is now offering below undergraduate courses

Faculty of Business and Management Studies 

 Department of Accountancy

 Bachelor of Technology Accounting
 HND Accounting

 Department of Purchasing & Supply

 Bachelor of Technology Procurement & Supply Chain Management
 HND Purchasing & Supply

 Department of Marketing

 Bachelor of Technology Marketing
 HND Marketing

 Department of Secretaryship & Management Studies

 Bachelor of Technology Secretaryship & Management Studies
 HND Secretaryship & Management Studies

 Department of Professional Studies

The department runs Diploma in Business Studies (DBS) with various options;

 DBS Statistics
 DBS Information Technology (IT)
 DBS Entrepreneurship
 DBS Accounting
 DBS Purchasing & Supply
 DBS Banking & Finance
 DBS Marketing
 DBS Secretarial

 Department of Liberal Studies

Faculty of Applied Science and Technology 

 Bachelor of Technology (B.Tech.)
 HND Statistics
 HND Computer Science
 HND Network Management
 HND Hospitality Management
 HND Food Technology (Morning only)
 HND Postharvest Technology (Morning only)
 HND Fashion Design and Textiles (in collaboration with Cape Coast Polytechnic)

Faculty of Engineering 

 B.Tech. Automotive Engineering
 B.Tech. Civil Engineering
 B.Tech. Mechatronics Engineering
 B.Tech. Telecommunication Engineering
 B.Tech. Renewable Energy Systems Engineering
 HND Environmental Management Technology
 HND Automotive Engineering
 HND Mechanical Engineering
 HND Renewable Energy Systems Engineering
 HND Electrical/Electronic Engineering
 HND Civil Engineering
 Construction Technician Course I, II, and III
 Electrical Engineering Technician I, II, and III
 Motor Vehicle Technician I, II, and III
 Mechanical Engineering Technician I, II, and III

Faculty of Built and Natural Environment 
The aspect of engineering and social sciences, built environment, or built world, directly point to the human-made environment that provide the setting for human activity, commencing in scale from buildings to cities and over. It refers to "the human-made space in which people live, work and recreate on a day-to-day basis."

The sciences of the built environment cover architecture, urbanism, building technology, civil engineering, landscaping and the management of built stock mutations and operations. The built environment comprehends places and spaces enacted or amended by people to serve their needs of accommodation, organisation and representation. Below are its related courses;

 B.Tech. Building Technology
 HND Building Technology
 HND Environmental Management Technology

Faculty of Health and Allied Sciences

 HND Statistics
 HND Hospitality Management
 HND Computer Science
 HND Network Management
 Cookery 812/1 & 2
 Food and Beverage Service
 Fashion and Designing
 CISCO

Faculty of Engineering

Dean: Dr. John Bonney (PhD. (London), MSc. (Kumasi), BSc. (Kumasi)

Non HND Programmes
CTC I, II & III
EET I, II & III
MVT I, II & III
MET I, II, III
Pre HND OR Access Course

School of Applied Science and Technology
Dean: Dr Seth Okyere Darko  (PhD (China), MSc. (Kumasi), Bsc (Kumasi), GSA

Non HND Programmes
Cookery 812/1 & 812/2 and food beverage services
CISCO
ICDL

School of Business and Management Studies
Dean: Dr. Regina Bekoe-Biney PhD (Costa Rica), MA, PgDp (Cape coast), BEd, Dip, CIAMC-Ghana

Non-HND Programmes
 DBS Accounting
 DBS Secretarial
 DBS Purchasing
 DBS Marketing
 DBS Statistics
 DBS Management
 DBS Computer Science
 DBS Computer Engineering

Panorama

References

Polytechnics in Ghana
Koforidua
Educational institutions established in 1997
1997 establishments in Ghana
Education in the Eastern Region (Ghana)
Universities in Ghana